KWTO-FM ("101.3 Real Country") is a radio station broadcasting a classic country music format, licensed to Buffalo, Missouri, United States. The station was previously owned by Stereo Broadcasting, a subsidiary of Meyer Communications.

History
As KTXR, the station was a longtime beautiful music/easy listening station that had modified its format to a more contemporary Soft AC sound in recent years. The station recently unveiled a new approach dubbed "Timeless Love Songs", a mixture of classic AC/soft rock hits, classic and contemporary versions of pop standards, and smooth jazz cuts. The new format replaces the AC chart currents the station used to play with "new standards" artists such as Norah Jones, Michael Bublé, Diana Krall, Queen Latifah, Rod Stewart, and Renee Olstead.

On April 30, 2012, KTXR tweaked its format from soft AC/adult standards to mainstream adult contemporary. But after three years in the format and trailing rival KGBX-FM, Meyer announced that it was moving KBFL's Southern Rock/Country hybrid format to KTXR on November 2, 2015.

On November 2, 2015 at midnight, KTXR changed its format to country, branded as "101.3 The Outlaw, Genuine Red Dirt Country", the format and branding moving over from 99.9 after both simulcasted for a short time.

On August 11, 2020, after final completion of the purchase of the group of Springfield radio stations owned by Meyer Communications (KWTO, KWTO-FM, KTXR, KBFL, and KBFL-FM) by Zimmer Midwest Communications, KWTO-FM completed a format change to soft rock with the new moniker "98.7 the Dove". In an additional surprise move, it was announced that Zimmer filed to swap the call letters of 98.7 KWTO-FM with that of 101.3 FM KTXR. 98.7 the Dove immediately began identifying as KTXR. The call sign change was registered by the FCC on August 20. Since KTXR was a prominent part of "The Outlaw" branding, 101.3 FM also continued to identify as KTXR for a short time (with the exception of their top of the hour station identification messages saying "101.3, KWTO-FM Springfield").

On September 17, 2020, 101.3 FM changed its format from red dirt country to classic country, branded as "101.3 Real Country" and began officially identifying as KWTO-FM. Effective June 30, 2022, KWTO-FM moved its community of license from Springfield to Buffalo.

HD Radio
KWTO-FM is licensed for HD Radio operations and features Smooth Jazz 24 hours a day on its HD2 channel.

References

External links

WTO-FM
Classic country radio stations in the United States
Radio stations established in 1962
1962 establishments in Missouri